A True Champion is the debut studio album by Nigerian producer and songwriter Rexxie. It was released on 28 June 2021 by Hitxlab and distributed by Dvpper Music. 
The 17-track album features guest appearances from Davido, Naira Marley, Teni, Zlatan, Peruzzi, MohBad, Bad Boy Timz, Zinoleesky, Bella Shmurda, BNXN fka Buju, Oxlade, Lyta, T-Classic, Blanche Bailly, Sarkodie, Ms Banks, Moelogo, Kida Kudz, and Midas The Jagaban. 
The album combines elements from Amapiano, Afropop with Neo-soul percussive rhythms.

Background

Rexxie recorded A True Champion after series of producing hit songs and collaborations including songs off Grammy award winning Twice As Tall album by Burna Boy.

He released his second single titled All featuring Davido on the anticipated debut studio album A True Champion,

Composition

The album opens with "Frenemies," a composition by Oxlade that relies heavily on percussion and uses a brief acoustic solo in the song's closing seconds to reflect on harmful rivalries. On "Boi Boi," Teni delivers a catchy tune and preaches the don't-be-stupid gospel over a keyboard-heavy beat reminiscent of Dr. Sid's "Pop Something."  Sarkodie delivers two aggressive verses in his native Twi on "Mofoti 2.0," while Naira Marley adds some spice with a chant that transforms the song from a passable filler to a possible club hit. On "Banger," a song that depends on samples of South African club music and has minimal lyricism, Rexxie enlists Asake's assistance.

Critical reception

A True Champion received mixed reviews from music critics. In review for Thenet however, says there is still a lot to be saved, it would be good to see South Africans shifting to the "KPK" Remix, and "Motherland" is evidence that Rexxie can be versatile with his production. 

Okayafrica says that Rexxie is most recognised for creating "afropiano" by fusing aspects of amapiano with the zanku sound in Afrobeats. The first sample of the sound was "KPK," which has achieved numerous outstanding milestones since its release in December 2020, including garnering over 50 million streams across all streaming platforms.

Track listing

Release history

References

2021 debut albums
Albums by Nigerian artists